William "Leo" McKillip (January 26, 1929 – December 24, 2013) was an American football coach and college athletics administrator.  He served as the head football coach at Idaho State University from 1966 to 1967, Saint Mary's College of California from 1970 to 1973, and Dana College in Blair, Nebraska, from 1985 to 1992.  McKillip was also the athletic director at Dana from 1986 to 1993.

McKillip died at age 84 in 2013 in Omaha, Nebraska.

Head coaching record

College

References

1929 births
2013 deaths
American football halfbacks
Dana Vikings athletic directors
Dana Vikings football coaches
Edmonton Elks coaches
Idaho State Bengals football coaches
Saint Mary's Gaels football coaches
United States Football League coaches
Winnipeg Blue Bombers coaches
High school football coaches in Nebraska
People from McCook, Nebraska
Players of American football from Nebraska